The Northwood-Kensett Community School District is a rural public school district headquartered in Northwood, Iowa.

The district is completely within Worth County, and serves Northwood, Kensett and the surrounding rural areas.

Michael Crozier became the superintendent of the Northwood-Kensett Community School District in 2013, and suffered a heart attack a week after moving to Northwood.  In 2019, the district entered a superintendent sharing agreement with St. Ansgar Community School District, and Mr. Crozier now splits his time between the two districts.

Schools
The district operates two schools, in one facility in Northwood:
 Northwood-Kensett Elementary School
 Northwood-Kensett Jr.-Sr. High School

Northwood-Kensett High School

Athletics
The Vikings participate in the Top of Iowa Conference in the following sports:
Football
Cross Country
Volleyball
Basketball
Boys' 2007 Class 1A State Champions
Wrestling
Golf
Track and Field
Baseball
Softball

See also
List of school districts in Iowa
List of high schools in Iowa

References

External links
 Northwood-Kensett Community School District

School districts in Iowa
Education in Worth County, Iowa